Simon John Cadell (19 July 1950 – 6 March 1996) was an English actor, best known for his portrayal of Jeffrey Fairbrother in the first five series of the BBC situation comedy Hi-de-Hi!.

Early life
Born in London, he was the son of theatrical agent John Cadell, grandson of the Scottish character actress Jean Cadell, great nephew of Francis Cadell RSA, the brother of the actress Selina Cadell and commercials director Patrick Cadell, the cousin of the actor Guy Siner and son-in-law of the television producer David Croft. He was educated at The Hall School in Hampstead and Bedales School at Petersfield where his close friends included Gyles Brandreth, who remained a friend until Cadell's death.

Career
Cadell was a member of the National Youth Theatre and appeared with them in the 1967 production of Zigger Zagger. He trained at the Bristol Old Vic Theatre School. His first successes were found in the theatre in the mid to late 1970s. An early television role was in Simon Gray's 'Play for Today's in 1975 Plaintiffs and Defendants and the sequel Two Sundays both opposite Alan Bates. He then provided the voice of Blackberry in the animated adaptation of Watership Down (1978), based on the novel by Richard Adams. Subsequently, he had roles in television programmes such as Enemy at the Door (1978–80), and also appeared briefly in the disaster film Meteor (1979) as a TV news reporter.

He is best remembered for his role as the well-meaning holiday camp manager Jeffrey Fairbrother in the BBC situation comedy Hi-de-Hi! (1980–84) and for playing the disingenuous civil servant Dundridge in the screen adaptation of a novel by Tom Sharpe, Blott on the Landscape (1985). On radio he played the elven-king Celeborn in the BBC adaptation of The Lord of the Rings (1981). He appeared in the BBC sitcom Life Without George (1987–1989) which ran for three series.

Cadell appeared in the 1991 British comedy series Singles. Other television credits include, Minder, Bergerac, The Kenny Everett Television Show and Roald Dahl's Tales of the Unexpected (playing the co-pilot in the episode "Hijack"). He was also in heavy demand as a voice-over for television commercials. He narrated the children's television series Bump for the BBC, about a baby elephant (who always bumps into things) and his friend Birdie.

Personal life

In 1986 Cadell married actress Rebecca Croft, the daughter of Dad's Army and Hi-de-Hi! co-creator David Croft. The couple had two sons.

Death
In January 1993 Cadell, a heavy smoker of up to 80 cigarettes a day, suffered a near-fatal heart attack after giving a recital with Joanna Lumley at the Queen Elizabeth Hall, in London. He returned to the stage four months after undergoing triple heart bypass surgery, but was diagnosed with lymphoma in September 1993, while being treated for pneumonia.

Cadell died in London on 6 March 1996, at the age of 45. He is buried with his father in the Cadell family grave in Dean Cemetery in western Edinburgh. The grave lies on the southern wall.

Three months after Cadell's death, his best friend Jeremy Sinden, who was five weeks older than he was, also died of cancer. For more than 30 years, Simon Cadell's father, John, had been the theatrical agent of Jeremy Sinden's father, Donald Sinden.

Television roles

Film roles

References

External links 
 
 New York Times Movies entry for Simon Cadell

1950 births
1996 deaths
20th-century English male actors
Alumni of Bristol Old Vic Theatre School
Burials at the Dean Cemetery
Deaths from cancer in England
Deaths from lymphoma
English male radio actors
English male stage actors
English male television actors
English people of Scottish descent
Laurence Olivier Award winners
Male actors from London
People educated at Bedales School
People educated at The Hall School, Hampstead